The Communauté urbaine d'Arras is the communauté urbaine, an intercommunal structure, centred on the city of Arras. It is located in the Pas-de-Calais department, in the Hauts-de-France region, northern France. It was created in January 1998, replacing the previous district urbain d'Arras. Its area is 306.0 km2. Its population was 108,347 in 2018, of which 41,555 in Arras proper.

Composition
The Communauté urbaine d'Arras consists of the following 46 communes:

Achicourt
Acq
Agny
Anzin-Saint-Aubin
Arras
Athies
Bailleul-Sir-Berthoult
Basseux
Beaumetz-lès-Loges
Beaurains
Boiry-Becquerelle
Boiry-Sainte-Rictrude
Boiry-Saint-Martin
Boisleux-au-Mont
Boisleux-Saint-Marc
Boyelles
Dainville
Écurie
Étrun
Fampoux
Farbus
Feuchy
Ficheux
Gavrelle
Guémappe
Héninel
Hénin-sur-Cojeul
Marœuil
Mercatel
Monchy-le-Preux
Mont-Saint-Éloi
Neuville-Saint-Vaast
Neuville-Vitasse
Ransart
Rivière
Roclincourt
Rœux
Sainte-Catherine
Saint-Laurent-Blangy
Saint-Martin-sur-Cojeul
Saint-Nicolas
Thélus
Tilloy-lès-Mofflaines
Wailly
Wancourt
Willerval

References

Arras
Arras